Gustav Schröder (27 September 1885 – 10 January 1959) was a German sea captain who in 1939 attempted to save 937 German Jews, who were passengers on his ship, from the Nazis.

Career
Schröder began his sea-going career in 1902 at the age of 16, aboard the training ship Großherzogin Elisabeth. Schröder finally reached the position of Captain after 24 years of service. In 1913, he was posted at Calcutta, India, but was interned there as an enemy alien throughout World War I. He began studying languages as a hobby and eventually became fluent in seven. When Schröder returned to Germany in 1919, he found himself without a job, due to the forced demilitarisation and the limit placed on the number of warships in the German Navy by the Treaty of Versailles. In 1921, he was hired by the shipping company HAPAG (Hamburg-Amerikanische Paketfahrt-Aktiengesellschaft), and in 1935, was promoted to 1st officer on Hansa. In August 1936, he became master of MS Ozeana.

Voyage of the Damned

He insisted his passengers be treated with respect and allowed them to conduct religious services on board, even though he knew this would be viewed unfavorably by the then ruling Nazi Party. The refugees were refused entry at Cuba and neither the United States nor Canada would let them land, forcing Schröder to return with them to Europe. Instead of delivering his passengers into the clutches of the Nazis and the concentration camps that awaited them in Germany, he stalled the trip as he tried to find asylum for the Jewish people on board. Eventually the passengers were landed in Belgium and all were accepted by Belgium, France, the Netherlands, and the UK. 

The events of the voyage are told in the 1974 book Voyage of the Damned, written by Gordon Thomas and Max Morgan-Witts, which was the basis of a 1976 film drama of the same name, and the book The German Girl by Armando Lucus Correa.

Later years
Still in command of St. Louis, Schröder prepared for another transatlantic voyage, but his passengers were not allowed to board. En route, Britain and France had declared war on Nazi Germany. Returning from Bermuda, Schröder evaded a Royal Navy blockade and docked at then neutral Murmansk. With a skeleton crew, he managed to slip past Allied patrols and reached Hamburg on New Year's Day of 1940. He was assigned a desk job and never went to sea again. After the war, he worked as a writer and tried to sell his story. He was released from de-Nazification proceedings on the testimony of some of his surviving Jewish refugee passengers.

Schröder was married and lived with his family in Hamburg. He died in 1959 at the age of 73.

Honors and tributes
Schröder received much praise for his actions during the Holocaust, both while he was alive and posthumously. In 1957, he was awarded the Order of Merit by the Federal German Republic "for services to the people and the land in the rescue of refugees". In March 1993, Yad Vashem honored Schröder with the title of "Righteous Among the Nations" by the State of Israel. In 2000, his home town Hamburg named a street after Schröder and unveiled a detailed plaque at the landing stages.

In popular culture
In the 1976 drama film about the St. Louis, Voyage of the Damned, Schröder is played by Swedish-French actor Max von Sydow.

In the 2017 book Refugee, Schröder is included in the story about a fictional boy (Josef Landau) aboard the St. Louis.

References

1885 births
1959 deaths
German sailors
German Righteous Among the Nations
Recipients of the Cross of the Order of Merit of the Federal Republic of Germany